The 2014 Carlow Senior Hurling Championship is the 85th staging of the Carlow Senior Hurling Championship since its establishment by the Carlow County Board in 1927. The championship began on 11 July 2014.

Mount Leinster Rangers were the defending champions, however, they were defeated in the semi-final stages.

Fixtures and results

Table

Round 1

Round 2

Round 3

Round 4

Round 5

Semi-finals

Final

Championship statistics

Miscellaneous

 In the semi-final between Naomh Moling and Erin's Own, four red cards are handed out, all for Erin's Own who finished with eleven players.

Top scorers
Group stage

References

Carlow Senior Hurling Championship
Carlow Senior Hurling Championship